Lev Loseff (birth name Lev Lifshitz; June 15, 1937 – May 6, 2009) was a Russian poet, literary critic, essayist and educator.

Early life and education
The son of poet Vladimir Lifshitz, Loseff was born in Leningrad. He attended Leningrad's famous Saint Peter's School and graduated from the journalism department of the Leningrad State University.

Literary career
Loseff immigrated to the U.S. in 1976.  He earned a Ph.D. in Slavic Languages and Literatures from the University of Michigan and became a professor of Russian literature at Dartmouth College in Hanover, New Hampshire, a position he held until his death thirty years later.  In his later years Loseff was a Russian-language radio personality and a prolific author, writing both poetry and non-fiction works on Russian literature.

Loseff died on May 6, 2009, in Hanover, NH.

Works
Joseph Brodsky: A Literary Life
Joseph Brodsky: The Art of a Poem (co-edited with Valentina Polukhina)
Iosif Brodskii: Trudy i dni (co-edited with Petr Vail)
On the Beneficence of Censorship: Aesopian Language in Modern Russian Literature
Poetika Brodskogo
Brodsky's Poetics and Aesthetics (co-edited with Valentina Polukhina)
A Sense of Place: Tsarskoe Selo and Its Poets (co-edited with Barry Scherr)
Eight collections of poetry and prose in Russian.

References

External links
 http://www.vavilon.ru/texts/prim/losev0.html
 http://www.rvb.ru/np/publication/02comm/10/07losev.htm
 Photographs of Loseff
 Book review of Loseff's biography of Joseph Brodsky.
  Interview with Loseff in Ogonyok magazine.
 http://levloseff.blogspot.com/
 "Joseph Brodsky: A Literary Life by Lev Loseff" in Quarterly Conversation 

1937 births
2009 deaths
American literary critics
American male poets
Jewish poets
Dartmouth College faculty
American people of Russian-Jewish descent
Russian Jews
Russian literary critics
Saint Petersburg State University alumni
University of Michigan alumni
Russian male poets
20th-century American poets
20th-century American male writers
20th-century American non-fiction writers
American male non-fiction writers